Remetinec is a neighborhood in the Novi Zagreb – zapad city district of Zagreb, the capital of Croatia. It is located south of the Remetinec Roundabout and Lanište, west of Trokut and the railway triangle and west of Blato. It has a population of 5673(2021). Zagreb Fair and Zagreb Hippodrome are located nearby Remetinec.

See also
Remetinec prison

References

Neighbourhoods of Zagreb
Novi Zagreb